Tore Brovold (born 12 June 1970)  is a Norwegian sport shooter competing in Skeet. Brovold was one of the Norwegian athletes competing in the 2008 Summer Olympics in Beijing, where he won a silver medal. Later the same year, he won the 2008 ISSF World Cup Final.

Brovold started shooting in 1977, when he was only 7 years, and participated in his first competition two years later. He began skeet shooting in 1996.

World records

Trainer
Tore Brovold is currently training the danish skeet shooter Jesper Hansen, who is going to the Olympics in Tokyo in 2021.
Tore Brovold has been the trainer of the Indian Skeet Shooters Mairaj Ahmad Khan, Gurjoat Siingh Khangura and Angad Vir Singh Bajwa.

References

External links
 Official website

1970 births
Norwegian male sport shooters
Skeet shooters
Shooters at the 2008 Summer Olympics
Olympic shooters of Norway
Olympic silver medalists for Norway
Living people
Olympic medalists in shooting
Shooters at the 2012 Summer Olympics
Medalists at the 2008 Summer Olympics
European Games competitors for Norway
Shooters at the 2015 European Games
21st-century Norwegian people